James G. McCune (born September 17, 1950) is an American politician and businessman serving as a member of the Washington State Senate, representing the 2nd district since 2021. A member of the Republican Party, he previously served as a member of the Pierce County Council, representing the 3rd district from 2017 to 2021 and as a member of the Washington House of Representatives from 1998 to 1999 and again from 2005 to 2013.

Early life and education 
McCune was born in Seattle and raised in Graham, Washington. He earned his high school diploma from Highline High School in Burien, Washington.

Career 
McCune began his career as a provider of Copper River salmon products. He later served on the board of the Prince William Sound Aquaculture Corporation. McCune served as a member of the Washington House of Representatives in 1998. In 2004, he was again elected to the House, serving until 2013.

He served as a member of the Pierce County Council, representing the 3rd district from 2013 to 2021.

After incumbent Republican Randi Becker announced her retirement from the Washington State Senate, effective after the end of the 2020 legislative session, McCune announced his candidacy to succeed her. McCune placed first in the August 2020 Republican primary and will face Marilyn Rasmussen in the November general election.

References

External links 
 Jim McCune at ourcampaigns.com

1950 births
Living people
Republican Party members of the Washington House of Representatives
Pierce County Councillors
Politicians from Seattle
Highline High School alumni
Republican Party Washington (state) state senators